Joshua Atherton (June 20, 1737 – April 3, 1809), was a lawyer and early anti-slavery campaigner in Massachusetts and New Hampshire. He served as Attorney General of New Hampshire. In later years he was also commissioner for the United States direct tax.

Early life and education
He was the son of Col. Peter Atherton and Experience Wright. He was named after his grandfather; Joshua Atherton (b. May 13, 1656, d. 1721) a soldier in King Philip's War, under Captain Daniel Henchman (1623-1685) of Boston, who settled at Still River, Massachusetts in 1687, then part of Lancaster, Massachusetts and became a farmer and a tanner.

His father was a blacksmith by trade, a farmer, magistrate and politician.
Atherton attended local schools in Worcester County, Massachusetts and was tutored by the clergy. He was brought up to be farmer and was expected to follow his father's footsteps and enter the lucrative blacksmithing trade. However Atherton was a sickly boy and was not considered suited to heavy labor. Instead he sought an education, tutored younger children in order to pay towards college, running a local school in order to save for the tuition fees. At the age of 21, Atherton went on to study law under James Putnam at Harvard College, graduating in 1762, alongside Francis Dana and  Elbridge Gerry. His younger brother Israel (1741-1822), did not share his passion for politics, choosing to study medicine at Harvard College and graduated that same year.

Career
After completing his term in the chambers of James Putnam, Atherton, after being admitted to the bar in Worcester, Massachusetts opened his first law practice in Petersham, Massachusetts, in 1765. Atherton was also a teacher at the time. Atherton then decided to move to the Province of New Hampshire, moving to Litchfield, New Hampshire, then settled in Merrimack where he established a law practice from 1765 to 1773. Under his tutelage was William Gordon, his future son in law, William Coleman and William Plumer. He moved to Amherst, became a farmer and was elected as the Register of Probate in Hillsborough County in 1773.

The onset of the American Revolution
Atherton was victimized for his loyalist sympathies, however minor. He had been known for hosting a prominent Loyalists and often found an angry mob at his doorstep. His  memoirs reveal that he did not initially believe the patriotic cause could ever succeed. He had established strong friendships with British officials. As a law man, he sympathetic to the Tory cause, and maintaining a status quo. He witnessed what he perceived to be treasonous acts, and chose not to participate in patriotic plans for fear of a breakdown in the rule of law. It was a time when those like Atherton, with some loyalist sympathies, had to decide whether to stay or leave the town. Many of his peers had to make hard choices. He likely choose to stay for economic reasons. In doing so, his daily life was subject to scrutiny and often he expressed safety concerns with his peers. Both he and his family were subject to risk of attack and torment by mobs on a frequent basis. He was disarmed, his beloved riffle confiscated, and on a number of times he was detained by the committee of safety due to his opposing views. Crowds often congregated outside his home, taunting him to leave the town, often gaining entry. However Atherton believed order would prevail. He was active politically, during his adult life. At times out of tune with many of his neighbors, since he was resistant to change, and controversial enough for arsonists to torch his barns and burn his effigy in the town.

New Hampshire was one of the thirteen colonies that rebelled against British rule during the American Revolution. Atherton at first joined the opponents to British rule, but refused to join the local Sons of Liberty, a secret revolutionary organization created to advance the rights of the colonists and fight taxation by the British government. Atherton then tried to remain neutral during the Revolution, believing the colonists could not win a war with England. The community was offended by his stance and had him arrested in 1777, jailing him in nearby Exeter, New Hampshire. As a result, he was fired from his position as register of probate and justice of the peace, and he resumed farming.

After taking an oath of allegiance to the new state of New Hampshire in 1779, Atherton started practicing law again. In 1782, he became the leader of the Amherst committee to help draft a state constitution. The next year, as a member of the New Hampshire state constitutional convention, he helped revise state laws, advocated for a bill of rights for citizens, and fought to settle former Loyalist land claims. He was a state senator in 1793.

Major speech at convention
In 1787 he was elected as a delegate to the convention in New Hampshire to ratify the federal constitution. He worked hard to defeat its ratification unless certain amendments were adopted. Atherton claimed it was poorly written; he insisted on a bill of rights to protect private beliefs and actions, and also defended the rights of town and state government against a too strong centralized government.

In February 1788, Atherton delivered a major speech in opposition to Article 1, Section 9, Clause 1, of the proposed constitution. The focal point of his speech was about the evils of slavery. Atherton asserted that the southern states had made him a "partaker in the sin and guilt of this abominable" traffic in the buying and selling of slaves, and that the "clause has not secured its abolition". He argued that "we will not lend the aid of our ratification to this cruel and inhumane merchandise, not even for a day". Atherton continued on with a vivid description of the conditions of slavery, proclaiming:

He voted against its adoption, on instructions from the town. The state finally ratified the constitution on June 21, 1788, with 57–47 in flavor. John Langton immediately wrote to George Washington to inform him that New Hampshire had become the ninth state which he described as the “Key Stone in the Great Arch. Atherton, who campaigned against ratification gracefully accepted the result and stated 'It’s adopted. Let’s try it'”.

As a staunch anti-federalist he wrote to John Lamb on June 23, 1788.

He was a candidate for New Hampshire in the 1788 and 1789 United States House of Representatives elections, and the 1789 New Hampshire's at-large congressional district special election, the first special election in the history of the United States House of Representatives.

Atherton was also a candidate in  the 1792 and 1793 United States House of Representatives elections.

Public office
In 1791, Atherton was once again elected as justice of the peace, and was a member of the convention in Concord that drafted the new state constitution, revising the previous one of 1783. From 1792 to 1793, he was a member of the state senate, and after his resignation in 1793 from the senate, he was elected state attorney general that same year.

In 1798, he was elected commissioner of Hillsborough County. In 1803 he retired because of a heart ailment.

Personal life
His father, Col. Peter Atherton served in the Massachusetts Colonial Militia, then seen as a political position,  rising to the rank of Colonel. The law in Massachusetts required all able men to keep a firearm and volunteer in the citizen army known as the militia. His father was a Minutemen. However the militia was also mustered to fight alongside the British soldiers engaging the threats resulting from the French and Indian War during the mid-1700s. His father went onto serve in a civic role for a number of years as a member of the General Court.

Atherton married Abigail Goss, the daughter of a Congregational Minister in 1765. His son, Charles Humphrey Atherton, continued his legacy practicing law, and as a politician, served as a United States Representative from New Hampshire, and as a member of the New Hampshire House of Representatives during the early 1800s. His daughter Mary Frances Atherton married William Gordon, a New Hampshire 
politician. His daughter Catherine 
 married David MacGregor Means (1841-1931), a lawyer and former assistant editor of The Nation. He was survived by 4 other daughters.

After his retirement, he helped establish the Franklin Society in Amherst, a library dedicated to historical events that changed the state. It was not associated with Societas Domi Pacificae which was founded several decades later.

Atherton died of heart disease on April 3, 1809 and is buried in Amherst Cemetery. Few of his personal papers survive, however his son published his memoirs.

Descendants
His grandson Charles Gordon Atherton also became politically active and went on to service as a Democratic Representative and Senator from New Hampshire, and was responsible for the gag rule of December 1838, known as the  “Atherton Gag”, which stifled any petitions relating to slavery. His grandson's reasons were likely to have been to placate southern interests, however Atherton, as an early ardent anti-slavery campaigner would have objected to his grandson's gag rule.

His granddaughter Abby Kent-Means was an American society hostess who acted as the White House hostess during the presidency of Franklin Pierce, as Pierce's wife Jane Pierce was not well enough to carry out official duties. Abby Kent-Means was Jane Pierce's maternal aunt.

Ancestry
Atherton has been incorrectly attributed as a descendant of Humphrey Atherton within certain notable sources. His great-grandfather James Atherton had arrived from England in the 1630s, and went on to serve under Captain John Whiting's Company, eventually becoming one of the founders of Lancaster. His great-grandfather on his maternal line was Samuel Wardwell, a carpenter, who was charged with witchcraft in 1692, and was hung at Witch Hill, in Andover, Massachusetts.

Notes

References

Further reading
 Payne, L. (2002, Jun 02). FYI: [THIRD EDITION]. Boston Globe 
 Daniell, J.R.,  Experiment in Republicanism, New Hampshire Politics & the American Revolution. (1970)
 Secomb, D.F., History of Amherst from 1728 to 1882. (1883)
 Turner, L.W. The Ninth State, New Hampshire's Formative Years. (1983)
 Shipton, C.K., Biographical Sketches of Those Who Attended Harvard College, Vol.15. Pages 167–172. (1970).

External links
 New Hampshire Historical Society
 Historical Society of Amherst
 Founders Online - under the John Adams Administration

Harvard College alumni
1737 births
1809 deaths
New Hampshire lawyers
New Hampshire Attorneys General
18th-century American lawyers
Christian abolitionists
American abolitionists
People from Lancaster, Massachusetts
People from Amherst, New Hampshire
People of colonial New Hampshire
Burials in New Hampshire
18th-century American farmers
19th-century American farmers